The Ministry of Foreign Affairs and International Cooperation is a cabinet-level government ministry responsible for the implementation and management of South Sudan's foreign policy and international activity. The incumbent minister is Mayiik Ayii Deng

List of ministers
This is a list of Ministers of Foreign Affairs and International Cooperation of South Sudan: 

7   Joseph Makuer Nyieth  

(b. 1978)   Secretary of  Foreign Affairs for South Sudan Democratic Alliance / Forces  2022 - Present

See also
Government of South Sudan

References 

Foreign Affairs and International Cooperation
Foreign relations of South Sudan
South Sudan, Foreign Affairs and International Cooperation
South Sudan